Hugh Bellot (1542 – 1596) was an English prelate during the Tudor period, who served as bishop of Bangor and then bishop of Chester.

Dr Bellot assisted William Morgan in his Welsh-language translation of the Bible.

Life
Bellot graduated B.A. from Christ's College, Cambridge, in 1564, proceeding M.A. before election as a fellow of Jesus College, Cambridge in 1567, later receiving the degree of D.D.

The third of ten sons of Thomas Bellot, lord of the manor of Moreton Magna, Cheshire by his wife Alice Roydon, a Welsh-speaker from Denbighshire, reputedly he was a misogynist.

A younger brother, Cuthbert Bellot, became Archdeacon of Chester, whilst he also helped secure an advantageous marriage for his nephew, Edward Bellot with Amy Grosvenor, whose grandson was created a baronet.

Bellot was consecrated as bishop of Bangor in 1585, and was translated in 1595 to the see of Chester. He died at Whitsuntide the following year at the Bishop's Palace, Chester being buried at Bersham, Denbighshire (now Clwyd).

See also 
Bellot baronets
Welsh Bible

Notes

References

External links
 www.british-history.ac.uk

1542 births
1596 deaths
People from Cheshire
Alumni of Christ's College, Cambridge
Fellows of Jesus College, Cambridge
16th-century Church of England bishops
16th-century Welsh Anglican bishops
Bishops of Bangor
Bishops of Chester
16th-century Anglican theologians